Bangladeshi rock music, or Bangla rock music, is a style of music in Bangladesh that is derived from British and American rock music, mixed with Bengali classical and adhunik musical styles from the 1960s. The genre was introduced in the 1960s by a few bands who began developing a distinctive rock sound of Bangladesh. Bangladeshi rock is commonly divided into two categories; the "East Pakistan" rock scene, and the "Bangladesh" rock scene. From the 1970s to the 2000s, it was one of the nation's most popular musical genres.

From the mid-1970s to the late 1990s, Bangladeshi rock was heavily influential in the development of various kinds of fusion genres in South Asia like folk rock, pop rock, hard rock and heavy metal. Bangladeshi rock bands during this era developed a very distinct sound, with the most popular bands commonly featuring keyboards. In the 2000s, several subgenres of Bangladeshi heavy metal music emerged, including thrash, death and progressive. From the 2000s to 2010s, additional rock genres developed, including art, psychedelic, post-grunge, progressive and alternative.

Rock and roll (1960s to mid-1980s)

Origins

The foundations of Bangladeshi rock started in the 1950s as a fusion of American rock and roll and Bengali classical music. In the 1960s, the Gramophone Company of Pakistan imported many LPs and singles from rock and roll artists like Cliff Richard and the Shadows, Elvis Presley, the Beatles, the Rolling Stones, the Beach Boys and the Hollies, which sold very well in Bangladesh. These artists were favored mostly by high school and college students. Drawing influences from 1950s and '60s rock and roll artists, Bangladeshi rock bands formed. Hence, mid-1960s Bangladeshi rock music was influenced by and developed a sound that was very similar in beat to the British Invasion and, in the late 1960s, to that of psychedelic rock.

There is much debate as to who was the first rock band in the country. Zinga, formed in 1963 in Chittagong, is the first contender, but their music was more like adhunik and did not have much of the rock and roll sound. The band introduced guitar, drums and piano, which made their music quite popular. Zinga was also the first band to perform Tagore songs with guitar and piano on East Pakistan TV (now BTV). It has also been argued that the Windy Side of Care was the first rock band of the country. Formed in 1964 in Dhaka, they started performing songs by Elvis Presley and Cliff Richard in clubs and hotels. They were also the first band to advertise themselves as performing psychedelic rock. Their self-titled debut album also featured the raga rock song "Raag Bageshri". In 1968, Zinga released their first song "Tomari Jiboney" which became very popular as it was aired on Shadhin Bangla Betar and East Pakistan TV. From the late 1960s, inspired by the Beatles, Zinga became interested in the singer-songwriter concept. Another band, formed by American students living in Dhaka called Insex Dui, was an American-Bangladeshi band that performed American and British psychedelic rock music in the 1960s.

Before becoming a successful Dhallywood actor, Zafar Iqbal was a singer in a band, The Rambling Stones, formed in 1966. Other popular rock bands of the 1960s included Ugly Phases, Fire in Ice and Time Ago Motion. None of these bands released any albums.

The Concert for Bangladesh

As East Pakistan struggled to become the separate state of Bangladesh during the 1971 Bangladesh Liberation War, the political and military turmoil and associated atrocities led to a massive refugee problem, with at least 7 million displaced people moving to neighbouring India.  Bengali musician Ravi Shankar first brought the issue to the attention of his friend George Harrison in the early months of 1971.

Concerts for relief efforts were held at 2:30 pm and 8:00 pm on Sunday, 1 August 1971 in Madison Square Garden. They featured a supergroup of performers that included Harrison, fellow former Beatle Ringo Starr, Bob Dylan, Eric Clapton, Billy Preston, Leon Russell and the band Badfinger. In addition, Shankar and Ali Akbar Khan performed an opening set of Indian classical music. The concerts were attended by a total of 40,000 people, and the initial gate receipts raised about USD$250,000 for Bangladeshi relief, which was administered by UNICEF. After gathering the musicians, Harrison found it extremely difficult to get the recording industry to release the rights for performers to share the stage, and millions of dollars raised from the album and film were tied up in IRS tax escrow accounts for years. The Concert for Bangladesh is considered to be a highly successful and influential humanitarian aid project, generating both awareness and considerable funds, as well as providing valuable lessons and inspiration for projects that followed, such as Live Aid.

The Concert for Bangladesh was the first-ever benefit concert in history. The concerts were followed by a bestselling live album, a boxed three-record set, and an Apple Films concert documentary, which opened in cinemas in 1972. The live album topped the chart in many countries and went on to win the Grammy Award for Album of the Year in 1973. The album had a big impact on Bangladeshi rock music in the early days, especially on Azam Khan.

Post-Independence

Most of the Bangladeshi rock bands from the 1960s did not become successful and disbanded after the war in 1971. Some musicians went abroad or formed new bands.

One of the first bands of independent Bangladesh was Underground Peace Lover (UPL), formed in 1972 in Dhaka. Uccharon were the biggest band of that era in South Asia. Inspired by the 1960s rock music and some Hindustani classical music, their frontman Azam Khan, a freedom fighter, introduced hippie fashion to the scene. He was also a renowned protest singer during the war. He inspired soldiers during training with his songs. His first song, "Hai Allah Re!" became a big hit in 1973, after its release. "Bangladesh", a song released by his band in 1975, was a protest song and inspired many bands to write songs about the struggle of the poor. They had more major hit songs in the decade including "Ami Jare Chaire" (1975), "Ashi Ashi Bole Tumi" (1977) and "Papri Keno Bojhena" (1978).

On the other hand, Spondan was a band mostly doing classical folk songs. Their first line up consisted of Nasir Ahmed Apu (singer-songwriter), Firoz Shai (folk-rock vocals), Ferdous Wahid (vocals), Aftab Kamal (vocals), Larry Burnaby (lead guitar), Jerry French (lead guitar), Happy Akhand (keyboard), Shahedul Huda (drums), Syed Jaglul Ali (rhythm guitar), Younus (rhythm guitar), and Musa Rahman (bass guitar). The founder of Spondan was Mansur Ahmed Nipu and the chief adviser was Sheikh Kamal. Nasir Ahmed Apu was the rock singer and only songwriter and music composer of Spondan. They became one of the most popular Bangladeshi rock bands during the 1970s. One of their songs, "Emon Ekta Maa Dena", briefly became the most popular song in Bangladesh. They were the first to mix traditional Bangla folk songs with western musical instruments. Sheikh Kamal died in 1975. The band disbanded for that year. They were also the first band in Bangladesh to perform Lalon geeti as a band, which later inspired many bands of the 2000s and 2010s. Their debut album, Spondan Bangladesh (1975), was the best-selling album of the decade. The protest songs of Uccharon inspired many bands of the 1980s and 1990s to write songs against the autocratic government.

Pop rock

In mid-1970s Bangladesh, more bands were formed, mostly in Chittagong and Dhaka. There were twenty to thirty bands in these two cities playing in clubs, hotels and halls. Most of these bands were influenced by the British Invasion, Adhunik music and the early rock and roll scene in Bangladesh.

The Akhand Brothers Band is often called the first pop rock band in the country. With their songs like "Abar Elo Je Shondha" (1972), "Ke Bashi Bajai Re" (1974), and "Neel Neel Shari Porey" (1978), the two brothers Lucky and Happy Akhand became very popular throughout the country. They helped almost all successful bands and artists like Ferdous Wahid, Kumar Bishwajit, Ayub Bachchu and James, throughout the late 1970s and '80s. Pop rock music was also led by the Chittagong-based rock band Souls. After their first single "Mon Shudhu Mon Chuyeche" came out in 1980, the band was appreciated by older rock bands and they released their debut album two years late, Super Souls, which made them one of the most popular bands in the country. Though not considered a rock band by many critics, Feedback was successful during the decade, using keyboards as a lead instrument, which gave them a more techno sound than any earlier band. Inspired by Azam Khan, they imitated hippie fashions, wrote songs to change the cultural values of Bangladesh, and were often political. Miles' self titled debut album, released in 1982, was the first all-English album in the country. It only featured two original songs by the band.

Most 1970s bands disbanded because of their vocalists' prominence. In the 1980s, however, members maintained cohesion and continued to release hit singles and albums into the 1990s.

Development (late 1980s to mid 1990s)

Blues rock

In parallel with Bangladeshi pop-rock music, some musicians were introducing blues as it was a much newer genre to many people. The guitarist of Souls, Ayub Bachchu released two albums as a solo artist, which were not exactly blues. In fact, for some people, it wasn't considered blues rock. Inspired by American and British blues rock, Feelings (now Nagar Baul) from Chittagong also released two successful blues rock albums, Station Road (1987) and Jail Theke Bolchi (1993). They were trying to get rock music out of the Adhunik music influence and to imitate the sound of the 1970s roots rock bands like the Eagles, Dire Straits, etc. A number of bands and artists followed the blues rock music of Feelings, such as Love Runs Blind. This type of music led Bangladeshi rock to have more subgenres emerging from it, like psychedelic rock and hard rock. One of the most important psychedelic rock bands of that era was Nova. The impact of the blues rock bands has declined since then. There was a renewed interest in the genre when Ayub Bachchu released his instrumental blues album Sounds of Silence (2007), which influenced several young guitarists but didn't get much popularity. In 2017, Bachchu started the Dhaka Jazz and Blues Festival, where blues and jazz musicians from many countries were invited.

Pop and hard rock

Bands from the 1980s continued their success along with the new bands of the '90s. Though from the 1960s to 1980s, many rock bands were formed in Chittagong. They went to Dhaka in the 1990s, as bands from Chittagong also came up to the city for better studio services and success. The 1990s are sometimes considered the most productive decade in Bangladeshi music history. Rock music became the most popular genre in the country. During the 1990s, it was common to divide mainstream rock into pop and hard rock. Pop rock got more popularity than the previous decades as fan-favorite bands like Souls and Feedback, whose frontman Maqsoodul Haque established the Bangladesh Musical Bands Association (BAMBA) in 1987, began. BAMBA was formed to arrange a three-day charity concert at the Sheraton Hotel. The aim was to raise funds to help victims of the devastating flood in Bangladesh that year.  Around ৳250,000 was raised, all of which was donated for the rehabilitation of flood victims. BAMBA throughout the '90s organized many successful concerts that helped many bands with their career. New successful acts included Ark, Different Touch and Winning. Ark released a string of hit singles, including "Sweety", "Ekaki" and "Jare Ja", that formed a new pop rock sensation in the rock music scene. Along with Ark, the pop rock scene was celebrated the whole decade as it remained the most popular rock genre, even after two decades of introduction in the country. The decline of the genre was mainly because of many bands adopting a more pop sound influenced by Michael Jackson. Many bands also disbanded due to less success and personal problems between the band members.

In contrast, hard rock was more influenced by the 1960s psychedelic rock, blues rock and the 1970s Bangladeshi rock artists. The most successful and influential psychedelic rock band during that time was Nova.

The most successful band from the blues rock genre was Love Runs Blind, who went on to release several bestselling albums. Ayub Bachchu, the vocalist and electric guitarist of the band, is considered to be the greatest guitarist of Bangladesh and the one of the first to introduce the use of distortion. Some of the 80s bands were also becoming interested in the genre as its popularity grew. Feedback and Souls had some hard rock numbers in their albums from 1993-'96.

Drawing influence from the 1980s American soft rock, the genre found its way to Bangladesh during the mid-1990s. It wasn't very popular during the span of the decade, but had success for a couple of years between 1998 and 1999. Paper Rhyme released its self-titled debut album in 1996 and was praised by many contemporary musicians because of their decade-defining song "Ondhokar Ghore", which is one of the most-covered songs in Bangladesh. However, as Paper Rhyme disbanded in the early 2000s, the genre's popularity dropped.

Heavy metal

With roots in blues rock, psychedelic rock and the British heavy metal bands of the 1970s, heavy metal was introduced in Bangladesh in the mid-'80s by several bands formed by high school and college students. The bands that played heavy metal developed a thick, powerful sound, characterized by overt rhythmic basslines, highly amplified distortion, extended guitar solos, emphatic beats, and overall loudness.

Bangladeshi heavy metal songwriters, inspired by the lyrics of Azam Khan, wrote anti-establishment songs, against the autocrat government and about people's rights. The four pioneering metal bands in Bangladesh were Rockstrata, Warfaze, In Dhaka, and Aces. The first band to perform heavy metal songs in Bangladesh was Waves. Their mixed album Hooray, released in 1992, mostly contained heavy metal numbers and was called "the most important thing that Bangladeshi heavy metal needed", by many heavy metal musicians of the next decade. Throughout the 1990s, heavy metal was criticized for the loudness and protesting lyrics. Warfaze was the leader of the heavy metal scene in the 1990s. With their popularity, they helped the rise of heavy metal bands in the 2000s. Many subgenres emerged in the Bangladeshi music scene in the 2000s and 2010s, such as thrash metal, progressive metal and death metal. Cryptic Fate, who released the first all-English heavy metal album in the country, Ends are Forever (1994), was also part of the 1990s heavy metal scene. Their sound was often similar to the British heavy metal band Iron Maiden.

Though it was a very important subgenre of rock, besides pop rock and hard rock, many heavy metal bands didn't get the same popularity as Warfaze, and most of them disbanded the same decade. Heavy metal reached its peak of commercial popularity in 1997–'98, before many acts moved off in a variety of directions, including Warfaze and Cryptic Fate, who began to develop neo-classical metal and thrash metal respectively.

New subgenres (late 1990s to mid 2000s)

Folk rock

Bangladeshi rock bands wanted to prove their respect for the classical and folk music of the country to the classical music lovers, musicians, and critics. Following Azam Khan and Bangladeshi rock bands Windy Side of Care and Spondon, folk rock music came back when Dalchhut started performing it on their first three albums, Ah (1997), Hridoypur (2000) and Akashchuri (2002). Aurthohin, was formed mainly as a heavy metal band, but composed folk rock hits like "Adbhut Shei Cheleti" and "Amar Protichhobi". Frontman Saidus Salehin Sumon also composed folk rock songs as a solo artist. His debut solo album Sumon O Aurthohin was one of the first folk rock albums in the country. Aurthohin's first few records are also considered to be some of the first pure folk rock records in Bangladesh, as they used rock instruments in their songs.

Folk rock music gradually changed in the mid-2000s, when Bangla started composing Lalon songs as a band. The Lalon-inspired folk rock began when they released their debut album Kingkortobbobimurho in 2002. Their attitude toward the conservative Bangladeshi people impacted the teenagers and, along with many bands of that era, they were protesting against conservative religious leaders and politicians. Many bands started covering Lalon geeti, as they felt spirituality through his philosophy and drugs. Lalon Band and Arnob, etc. are some successful artists who performed Lalon songs. Renowned rock musician Ayub Bachchu was inspired to do folk songs by these bands and released Vatir Gane Matir Tane (2006), an Abdul Alim cover album. The folk rock scene later influenced successful bands like Chirkutt and Shironamhin, who were experimenting with many rock genres, mainly classical, rock and folk.

With an indiscriminate history, it was not very clear to tell what was the most perfect decade for Bangladeshi rock, which led to a feud between musicians Saidus Salehin Sumon and Ayub Bachchu. It began in the early 2000s, after Aurthohin's first release when Ayub Bachchu said "Aurthohin is a good band, but their music has no role behind the development of Bangladeshi rock music". Bachchu also warned people about AmaderGaan.com was selling music online, which he called bad for the music industry. He made the comment when he came to learn at one stage of the interview that Sumon had always made the allegation that Ayub Bachchu himself never promotes any newcomer or gives them any room in the industry.

Alternative music

Throughout the 1990s, American and British alternative bands were influencing several young bands in Bangladesh, especially late 1990s and early 2000s alternative rock. Alternative bands fused elements of hardcore punk and heavy metal into a single sound, and made heavy use of guitar distortion, fuzz, and feedback. The lyrics were typically apathetic and angst-filled, and often about political hypocrisy, identity crisis and war criminals of Bangladesh.

Around 1998, Wire, Kopropholia, Clover Minds, and the Spanking Monkeys began playing alternative rock in Dhaka. However, they weren't very successful during that time.

Experimental

Experimental rock is the mixture of rock with classical music of different cultures. The first experimental rock in Bangladesh is thought to have been started by Arnob in the mid-'00s. Experimental bands in Bangladesh sometimes used distortion on electric guitar, along with multiple instruments of different culture like: sitar, esraj, tabla, harmonium and flute. The artists of this genre usually write songs based on romance and their lyrics are often considered to be poetic.

Arnob, who had visual arts education from Visva Bharati University and Shironamhin, began to develop Bangladeshi rock in an artistic manner and soon got huge success as he sold half a million copies of his albums. Most of Arnob's early works were folk or some kind of fusion.His most experimental album was Arnob & Friends Live (2009), which contained songs from his world tour in 2008. Arnob and Shironamhin were also the first to release a Rabindra Sangeet album as rock artists. Shironamhin released Shironamhin Rabindranath in 2010 and Arnob released Adheko Ghume in 2012. These particular artists inspired people to start a cultural movement in the country to protest against the conservatism of religious leaders and politicians. Chirkutt were one of the only bands doing experimental rock in the 2010s. They toured heavily, mostly performing in stadiums and arenas, along with other bands like Arbovirus and Nemesis.

New millennium (late 2000s to mid 2010s)

Progressive and experimental metal

In the mid '00s folk and alternative rock scene, a few progressive metal bands were forming and performing in club shows in Dhaka. The progressive metal bands were inspired by the '90s heavy metal and '00s experimental rock bands. They developed a sound out of those two genres; playing heavier riffs, faster basslines and double bass drumming. Their lyrics typically highlighted anger about social injustice and hypocrisy as well as philosophical songs with softer tones.

Artcell was the band leading this genre and is partially responsible for popularizing it. Their first two studio albums, Onno Shomoy (2002) and Oniket Prantor (2006) had a big influence in the 2010s heavy metal scene of Bangladesh. The themes that Artcell used in their songwriting have impacted and changed the band music of Bangladesh. The alternative metal band Vibe also had a few progressive metal numbers in their album Chena Jogot in 2007. By the end of the decade, Artcell stopped releasing albums, which caused the decline of progressive metal and the increasing popularity of symphonic metal and experimental metal, both of which are derived from the former. Symphonic and experimental metal of the 2010s was mainly progressive metal, but with more orchestration and keyboards. Successful bands from this genre included De-illumination, Warfaze's late '00s and early '10s work, Sazzad Arefeen's Angry Machine, Hallucination and Ionic Bond, with the latter two mainly being melodic death metal bands. Hallucination released their debut full-length album Krittim Prithibi in 2013, which was the first Bengali melodic death metal album in Bangladesh. It was also the first album in Bangladesh which could be purchased via the bKash payment system. Later on, this album was also released internationally by Satanic Productions. Later on, Ionic Bond released their debut album Amavashya Lore, which was widely appreciated by Bangladeshi audiences despite being in English. While rock music was still popular throughout the country, a budding indie scene started to flourish in smaller concert arenas. Bands like The Crowd, Picket, Embers in Snow, Alfred, Headline, and Attic brought about a change in the sound of rock with English songwriting being a common practice in their music. They strayed away from their hard rock and metal predecessors and ventured into newer and independent music territory. During the early 2010s, the Bangladesh Musical Bands Association (BAMBA) and the Chittagong Musical Bands Association (CMBA) began organizing rock concerts in the Chittagong, which gave exposure to local underground bands. This resulted in the emergence of new rock bands in the city, such as Hemorrhage and Blunderware.

Many Bangladeshi progressive metal and experimental metal bands have changed popular rock music. Bands like Karnival and Owned have especially progressed the industry.  Karnival released three successful albums; whereas Owned has only published two. Following the unique trends, some bands like Messianic Era, Ossrik, Seventh Sign, Jogot, and Attic are also moving forward. By the end of the decade, Bangladeshi rock saw a resurgence of hard rock and alternative rock, with bands like Unmaad, the Conclusion, Adverb, and The Perfect Criminals releasing successful albums.

"Decline"

Many critics and musicians have claimed that, just like in the United States and United Kingdom, rock music lost its popularity in Bangladesh during the 2010s. Partially, it has lost ground to Bollywood music from neighboring India. Bollywood songs dominate Bangladeshi radio, and pirated versions are available online for free. Bollywood music also influenced the music of Dhallywood, which saw the rise of pop singers like Arfin Rumey, Hridoy Khan, Imran Mahmudul and Armaan Alif. Meanwhile, an underground hip-hop scene has largely replaced rock as the most popular genre among the young. Domestic law has also failed to protect the financial interests of the artists who once drove Bangladesh's vibrant rock scene. Record industries say that just 10 percent of music in Bangladesh is purchased legally and estimate that music piracy annually costs US$180 million in lost earnings. Increased religiosity, which rejects all things Western in favor of a traditional lifestyle, has also made Bangladesh's rock scene less popular. Some Muslims in Bangladesh see rock music as a sin. The trend of a band's solo concert has lost its popularity, as concerts like Joy Bangla Concert and RockNation have become popular and sell thousand of tickets easily. Though losing popularity throughout the 2010s, some rock bands, such a: Love Runs Blind, Nagar Baul, Warfaze, Aurthohin, Artcell, Shironamhin and Chirkut still remain heavily popular.

Extreme metal

Extreme metal is mainly an underground genre, which got commercial success in Bangladesh in the late 2000s, when Powersurge and Mechanix took part in D-Rockstar 2008. In that competition, Powersurge finished in the first place and Mechanix in the second. They were the main powerhouse of extreme metal of Bangladesh. These two bands introduced thrash and groove metal to a wider audience. Severe Dementia introduced death few years before them. Death metal vocals usually delivered as guttural "death growls" and/or high-pitched screaming, complemented by downtuned, highly distorted guitars and extremely fast double bass percussion. The extreme metal bands had no intention of getting commercial success, as they were all fans of the underground extreme metal of the 1980s. These three bands are considered to be the pioneers of Bangladeshi extreme metal, introducing a different kind of style and sound in the Bangladeshi rock scene. They were also criticized for the horrific images on their album covers. Other important extreme metal bands in this decade include Hallucination, Minerva, Dissector, Thrash, Trainwreck and Nafaarmaan. In 2018, Saimum Hasan Nahian, the guitarist of pioneering extreme metal band Powersurge, urged the Wacken Open Air authorities to hold a concert in Bangladesh. The Wacken Metal Battle concert was held in the Russian Cultural Center, Dhaka where five metal bands, Karma, Ionic Bond, Torture Goregrinder, Infidel and Trainwreck, took part in the competition, and the latter band was the winner. They also performed in the Bangalore Open Air, where they won against other metal bands from Sri Lanka, Nepal and India, which got them the ticket to the Wacken Open Air as the first Bangladeshi band.

Notable bands of Bangladesh

See also 
 Bangladeshi heavy metal

Notes

Sources
 
 Peter Lavezzoli, The Dawn of Indian Music in the West, Continuum (New York, 2006).
 Nicholas Schaffner, The Beatles Forever, McGraw-Hill (New York, 1978).
 Simon Leng, While My Guitar Gently Weeps: The Music of George Harrison, Hal Leonard (Milwaukee, WI, 2006).
 The Editors of Rolling Stone, Harrison, Rolling Stone Press/Simon & Schuster (New York, 2002).
 Robert Rodriguez, Fab Four FAQ 2.0: The Beatles' Solo Years, 1970–1980, Backbeat Books (Milwaukee, Wis., 2010).

External links
 Best Rock Bands of Bangladesh by TheTopTens

20th-century music genres
21st-century music genres
Rock
Bengali music
Rock music by country